Crimson Delight is an apple cultivar and is a cross of a Splendour with a Gala. In February 2016 Washington State University relaunched the apple variety with the name Sunrise Magic. The apple is also known as WA 2. 

The Crimson Delight tree has a compact growth habit and is highly productive.  The fruit is not prone to sunburn or bitter pit and is harvested in the fall around late September to October.  Post-harvest the fruit is not sensitive to bruising and is easy to handle on packing lines.  The apple stores exceptionally well and can last 6 months in refrigerated storage and 12 months in controlled atmosphere storage.  Flavor peaks as it is stored and ripens further if set out on a counter for a few days to a week.

Crimson Delight is a multi-purpose apple intended for snacking, baking and fresh recipes.  The fruit size is medium to large with a firm texture and is crisp and juicy.  The skin is an orange red to pinkish blush over a limited yellow background.

Disease susceptibility
Bitter Pit: Low
Sunburn: Low
Stem Bowl Splits: Higher with late harvesting

See also
 List of apple cultivars

References

External links 
https://web.archive.org/web/20160212050844/http://www.kplu.org/post/wsu-team-creates-cascades-friendly-cousin-honeycrisp

American apples
Apple cultivars
Apple production in Washington (state)